Mangelia dorsuosa is a species of sea snail, a marine gastropod mollusk in the family Mangeliidae.

Description
The length of the shell attains 6 mm, its diameter 2.2 mm.

Distribution
This marine species occurs off Hong Kong.

References

 Gould, A. A. Descriptions of shells collected in the North Pacific Exploring Expedition1860. under Captains Ringgold and Rodgers. Proc. Boston Soc. Nat. Hist. 1859–1860 vol. 6–8

External links
  Tucker, J.K. 2004 Catalog of recent and fossil turrids (Mollusca: Gastropoda). Zootaxa 682:1–1295.
  R.I. Johnson, The Recent Mollusca of Augustus Addison Gould; United States National Museum, bulletin 239, Washington D.C. 1964

dorsuosa
Gastropods described in 1860